Albert Ramos Viñolas defeated Alejandro Tabilo in the final, 4–6, 6–3, 6–4 to win the singles title at the 2022 Córdoba Open.

Juan Manuel Cerúndolo was the defending champion, but withdrew with a right leg injury before the tournament began.

Seeds 
The top four seeds received a bye into the second round.

Draw

Finals

Top half

Bottom half

Qualifying

Seeds

Qualifiers

Lucky losers

Qualifying draw

First qualifier

Second qualifier

Third qualifier

Fourth qualifier

References

External links
 Main draw
 Qualifying draw

2022 Cordoba Open - 1
2022 ATP Tour
2022 in Argentine tennis